Lynebank Hospital is a health facility in Halbeath Road, Dunfermline, Scotland. It is managed by NHS Fife.

History 
The facility, which was designed by Alison & Hutchison & Partners, was officially opened by Princess Alexandra in May 1969. It was established as a specialist hospital for people with learning disabilities. In 2017 NHS Fife entered into a development agreement with Barratt Developments to develop a large part of the site for residential use. The amount of land earmarked for development has since been extended.

References 

Hospitals in Fife
NHS Scotland hospitals
1969 establishments in Scotland
Hospitals established in 1969
Hospital buildings completed in 1969
Buildings and structures in Dunfermline